Secrets of a Married Man is a 1984 American made-for-television erotic drama film starring William Shatner, Michelle Phillips and Cybill Shepherd. The film was directed by William A. Graham, written by Dennis Nemec and premiered on NBC on September 24, 1984.

Plot
William Shatner stars as Chris Jordan, a man going through a mid-life crisis. His wife Katie (Michelle Phillips) is attractive, however after having three children, they have lost the prior intimacy in their relationship. Chris begins seeing prostitutes, but after a series of scares involving a sexually transmitted disease and a close scrape with a police sting, he decides to stop and instead attempt to repair his relationship with his wife.

While shopping for lingerie as a gift for his wife, he is approached by Elaine (Cybill Shepherd), another prostitute, and Chris begins an intense relationship with her, resulting in an emotional attachment. Eventually, his dual life begins to unravel as he encounters problems from Elaine's pimp and attempts to hide his behaviour from his family.

Cast
William Shatner as Chris Jordan
Michelle Phillips as Katie Jordan
Glynn Turman as Jesse
Cybill Shepherd as Elaine
Jackson Davies as Terry
Kevin George as Brian
Dameon Clarke as Alex

References

External links 

1984 films
1984 television films
1984 drama films
Films about adultery in the United States
NBC network original films
Films about prostitution in the United States
Films about infidelity
Films directed by William Graham (director)
Films scored by Mark Snow
ITC Entertainment films
American drama television films
1980s American films